Colus is a genus of fungi in the family Phallaceae. The genus has a widespread distribution and, according to a 2008 estimate, contains four species.

Species 

Source:

References

External links

Phallales